Michael Flowers (born January 14, 1999) is an American basketball player. He previously played for the Western Michigan Broncos, South Alabama Jaguars and the Washington State Cougars. He was named second-team All-Pac-12 with Washington State in 2022.

High school career
Flowers played basketball for Southfield High School for the Arts and Technology in Southfield, Michigan. As a junior, he averaged 25 points, six rebounds and two steals per game. In his senior season, Flowers averaged 23 points, six assists and five rebounds per game. He was a two-time all-state selection in high school.

College career
As a freshman at Western Michigan, Flowers averaged 3.4 points per game. On December 15, 2018, he scored a sophomore season-high 31 points and seven rebounds in a 70–62 loss to Michigan. As a sophomore, Flowers averaged 15.7 points, 3.9 rebounds and 3.3 assists per game. On March 9, 2020, he scored a career-high 35 points in a 76–73 loss to Toledo at the first round of the MAC tournament. As a junior, he averaged 16.9 points, 3.3 assists and 2.9 rebounds per game, earning All-MAC honorable mention. He entered the transfer portal following the departure of head coach Steve Hawkins at the end of the season.

For his senior season, Flowers transferred to South Alabama. He was initially denied a waiver for immediate eligibility by the NCAA. Flowers alleged that Western Michigan had given away his scholarship without his knowledge while he was in the transfer portal, and that inconsistent communication from its athletic department caused some programs to stop recruiting him and resulted in his ineligibility. Before the season, the NCAA reversed its decision and ruled him eligible. On March 5, 2021, Flowers posted a season-high 34 points, five rebounds and four assists in an 80–72 victory against Louisiana–Monroe at the first round of the Sun Belt tournament. As a senior, he averaged 21 points, 4.6 rebounds and 3.6 assists per game, earning First Team All-Sun Belt and Newcomer of the Year recognition.

Flowers opted to return to college for a fifth season of eligibility, granted due to the COVID-19 pandemic, and transferred to Washington State. He chose the Cougars over offers from Arkansas, USC, Miami (Florida), Texas A&M, Florida, Colorado, and Marquette. He was named second-team All-Pac-12.

Career statistics

College

|-
| style="text-align:left;"| 2017–18
| style="text-align:left;"| Western Michigan
| 23 || 0 || 8.7 || .460 || .480 || .700 || 1.0 || .5 || .2 || .0 || 3.4
|-
| style="text-align:left;"| 2018–19
| style="text-align:left;"| Western Michigan
| 32 || 32 || 31.3 || .387 || .332 || .784 || 3.9 || 3.3 || .9 || .1 || 15.7
|-
| style="text-align:left;"| 2019–20
| style="text-align:left;"| Western Michigan
| 32 || 32 || 32.2 || .428 || .368 || .844 || 2.9 || 3.3 || .8 || .0 || 16.9
|-
| style="text-align:left;"| 2020–21
| style="text-align:left;"| South Alabama
| 28 || 28 || 37.2 || .438 || .388 || .818 || 4.6 || 3.6 || 1.6 || .1 || 21.0
|- class="sortbottom"
| style="text-align:center;" colspan="2"| Career
| 115 || 92 || 28.5 || .420 || .368 || .807 || 3.2 || 2.8 || .9 || .1 || 14.9

Personal life
Flowers' mother, Joyce, died in 2018 after a three-year battle with pancreatic cancer. In November 2020, his father, Henry, died from cancer after a lengthy fight.

References

External links
Washington State Cougars bio
South Alabama Jaguars bio
Western Michigan Broncos bio

1999 births
Living people
American men's basketball players
Basketball players from Michigan
Point guards
South Alabama Jaguars men's basketball players
Southfield High School alumni
Sportspeople from Southfield, Michigan
Washington State Cougars men's basketball players
Western Michigan Broncos men's basketball players